The 25 øre coin was minted between 1941 and 1945 during the German occupation of Denmark. They were made entirely of zinc, which was a cheap metal commonly used in the German-held territories for occupation currency.

Mintage

References

Denmark in World War II
Modern obsolete currencies
Coins of Denmark
Zinc and aluminum coins minted in Germany and occupied territories during World War II
Twenty-five-cent coins